The Kazakhstan men's national ice hockey team is controlled by Kazakhstan Ice Hockey Federation. Kazakhstan is ranked 16th in the world as of 2022. They have competed at the Winter Olympics twice, in 1998 and 2006. The national team joined the IIHF in 1992 and first played internationally at the 1993 Men's World Ice Hockey Championships. The team has frequently played at the elite division of the World Championship, often moving between there and the Division I level.

History
Kazakhstan joined the IIHF in 1992, applying as a separate member with six other former Soviet republics. They played their first IIHF tournament at the 1993 World Championship; as a new member they had to play in Group C, the lowest level. They reached the elite division for the first time in 1998, and have played at the elite level seven times (1998, 2004, 2005, 2006, 2010, 2012, 2014 and 2016).

The national team has appeared at the Winter Olympics twice, in 1998 and 2006. In their debut in 1998, the Kazakhs were able to win their preliminary group, surprising many, and would finish the tournament in 8th place. They returned for the 2006 Winter Olympics, and finished ninth overall.

The team is the most successful team at the Asian Games, winning it four times, and are the current highest ranked Asian team.

Tournament record

Olympic Games
1998 – Finished in 8th place
2006 – Finished in 9th place

World Championships
 1953–1991 As part of  / Kazakh SSR
1993 – Finished in 23rd place (3rd in Pool C)
1994 – Finished in 24th place (4th in Pool C)
1995 – Finished in 22nd place (2nd in Pool C)
1996 – Finished in 21st place (1st in Pool C)
1997 – Finished in 14th place (2nd in Pool B)
1998 – Finished in 16th place
1999 – Finished in 19th place (3rd in Pool B)
2000 – Finished in 18th place (2nd in Pool B)
2001 – Finished in 21st place (3rd in Division I, Group B)
2002 – Finished in 21st place (3rd in Division I, Group A)
2003 – Finished in 17th place (1st in Division I, Group A)
2004 – Finished in 13th place
2005 – Finished in 12th place
2006 – Finished in 15th place
2007 – Finished in 21st place (3rd in Division I, Group A)
2008 – Finished in 20th place (2nd in Division I, Group A)
2009 – Finished in 17th place (1st in Division I, Group A)
2010 – Finished in 16th place
2011 – Finished in 17th place (1st in Division I, Group B)
2012 – Finished in 16th place
2013 – Finished in 17th place (1st in Division IA)
2014 – Finished in 16th place
2015 – Finished in 17th place (1st in Division IA)
2016 – Finished in 16th place
2017 – Finished in 19th place (3rd in Division IA)
2018 – Finished in 19th place (3rd in Division IA)
2019 – Finished in 17th place (1st in Division IA)
2020 – Cancelled due to the coronavirus pandemic
2021 – Finished in 10th place
2022 – Finished in 14th place

Asian Winter Games
1996 –  1st place
1999 –  1st place
2003 –  2nd place
2007 –  2nd place
2011 –  1st place
2017 –  1st place

Winter Universiade
1993 –  2nd place
1995 –  1st place
2007 –  3rd place
2013 –  2nd place
2015 –  2nd place
2017 –  2nd place

Team

Current roster
Roster for the 2022 IIHF World Championship.

Head coach: Yuri Mikhailis

List of head coaches
Vladimir Goltze 1993–94
Vladimir Koptsov 1994–95
Boris Alexandrov 1996–02
Nikolay Myshagin 2003–06
Anatoli Kartayev 2007
Yerlan Sagymbayev 2007–09
Andrei Shayanov 2009–10
Andrei Khomutov 2010–11
Andrei Shayanov 2011–12
Vladimir Krikunov 2012–13
Ari-Pekka Selin 2013–14
Andrei Nazarov 2014–2016
Eduard Zankovets 2016–2017
Galym Mambetaliyev 2017–2018
Andrei Skabelka 2018–2020
Yuri Mikhailis 2020–

References

External links

IIHF profile

 
National ice hockey teams in Asia
National ice hockey teams in Europe